Dead ice is ice which, though part of a glacier or ice sheet, is no longer moving. When this melts it does so in situ, leaving behind a hummocky terrain known as dead-ice moraine which is produced by the deposition of glacio-fluvial sediments and ablation till. Such features include kettle holes. Landscapes forming Veiki moraines in northern Sweden and Canada have been attributed to the ablation of extensive bodies of till-covered dead ice.

References 

Glaciology